Nostalgia is a 2018 American drama film directed by Mark Pellington, written by Pellington and Alex Ross Perry, and starring Jon Hamm, Nick Offerman, Amber Tamblyn, Patton Oswalt, Catherine Keener, Ellen Burstyn, Bruce Dern, John Ortiz and James LeGros.

It premiered at the Palm Springs International Film Festival on January 6, 2018. It was released by Bleecker Street on February 16, 2018.

Plot
A mosaic of stories about love and loss that explores our relationship to objects, artifacts, and memories.

At a diner, middle-aged Daniel Kalman, an insurance agent, remarks on the beauty of sentimental jewelry worn by a waitress. He then visits Ronald Ashemore, an elderly architect living off a pension. His visit is for the purpose of evaluating Ashemore's possessions to satisfy granddaughter Bethany, and he's able to determine that a few pieces are worth enough value for an appraiser to look at.

Kalman's next visit is to Bethany and her husband. Pregnant, she is overwhelmed with being the sole decision-maker due to living the closest, but she does care deeply about her grandfather and doesn't wish to think of him dying. Back at the office Kalman studies the photographs he's taken that day, contemplating the lives lived.

The next day, his work takes him to meet Helen Greer, whose home has been destroyed by wildfire. She laments how very little time she had to grab what keepsakes she could. She was able to save a signed baseball Kalman determines may have some value. They discuss things at a neighbor's house over coffee with another couple who've also lost their home. Kalman remarks how he always learns something new from listening to people's stories.

Helen stays with her son Henry and his wife Lisa. Discussion to place her in assisted living is met with indignity, as is the thought of selling her things for cash before the insurance kicks in.

Helen flies to Las Vegas with a case containing the baseball to meet with an appraiser. She settles in to her hotel room, takes in some gambling and dines solo. After much emotional turmoil, she meets Will Beam to determine its worth.  It is an authentic item, he says, and the signature is that of Ted Williams.  Normally, most things he sees are worth $10–20,000 but he tells her this feels like it may be $80–100,000. Helen is amazed. After they converse awhile, Helen is finally able to go of her husband's priceless keepsake. Later, Will calls a potential buyer.

Will flies to his hometown in Virginia to meet older sister Donna. Will rides with Donna to their parents' house to go through things. The house is for sale and their parents have recently moved to a condo in Florida. Will is more matter-of-fact regarding the heirlooms that the quiet house holds, while Donna expresses her teen daughter Tallie's sadness over losing the one place that holds so many memories. Will stays overnight in the barren house, while Donna drives back to her own home.

The next day, Tallie tries to join them in sorting through keepsakes, but she is unable to connect with the many things that are older than she is. She leaves to join a friend, Kathleen, on a weekend trip. While disposing of many things into an onsite dumpster, Will comes across letters written by his own father, Will, to his mother, Joy, that expresses, among other things, deep love. Later he falls asleep to records playing soft jazz.

Will's sleep is interrupted by a frantic phone call from Donna. A drunk driver has hit the car the two girls were driving in and killed Tallie. Donna's husband Patrick picks up Will, and they rush back to console a distraught Donna. Later, Kathleen's parents, Peter and Marge come to console them as well.

Cast
 Jon Hamm as Will Bleam, Donna's brother
 Nick Offerman as Henry Greer, Helen's son
 Amber Tamblyn as Bethany Ashemore, Ronald's granddaughter
 Patton Oswalt as Peter
 Catherine Keener as Donna Bleam, Will's sister, Patrick's wife and Tallie's mother
 Ellen Burstyn as Helen Greer, Henry's mother
 Bruce Dern as Ronald Ashemore, Bethany's grandfather
 John Ortiz as Daniel Kalman, an insurance agent
 James LeGros as Patrick Bleam, Donna’s husband and Tallie's father
 Jennifer Mudge as Caitlin
 Annalise Basso as Tallie Bleam, Patrick and Donna's daughter and Kathleen's friend
 Joanna Going as Marge
 Arye Gross as Riley O'Bryan
 Mikey Madison as Kathleen, Tallie's friend
 Chris Marquette as Craig
 Lindsey Kraft as Tobey
 Ashlyn Faith Williams as Hillary

Release
The film's North American distribution rights were picked up by Bleecker Street at the 2017 Sundance Film Festival. It was released on February 16, 2018.

Critical reception
The website's critics consensus reads, "Nostalgia combines talented actors and honorable intentions, but poky pacing and a lack of depth make it unlikely the end result will ever inspire the titular emotion." On Metacritic, the film holds a rating of 47 out of 100, based on 22 critics, indicating "mixed or average reviews".

References

External links
 
 
 
 

2018 drama films
2018 independent films
2010s English-language films
American drama films
Bleecker Street films
Films directed by Mark Pellington
2010s American films